The Kalamazoo Hornets football program is a college football team that represents Kalamazoo College in the Michigan Intercollegiate Athletic Association, a part of the Division III (NCAA).  The team has had 25 head coaches since its first recorded football game in 1892. The current coach is Jamie Zorbo who first took the position for the 2008 season.

Key

Coaches
Statistics correct as of the end of the 2022 college football season.

Notes

References

Kalamazoo Hornets

Kalamazoo Football Coaches